The Algerian National Road Race Championships is a cycling race where the Algerian cyclists decide who will become the champion for the year to come.

Multiple winners
Men

Men

Elite

U23

Junior

See also
Algerian National Time Trial Championships
National Road Cycling Championships

References

National road cycling championships
Cycle races in Algeria
Cycling